Johan Roos (born 1961) is a Swedish organizational theorist known for his work on intellectual capital. He currently serves as Chief Strategy Officer at Hult International Business School, previously having served as President of Copenhagen Business School and Dean of the Stockholm School of Economics.

Biography 
In 1985 he also received his MSc in Agricultural Business and Management from the Swedish University of Agricultural Sciences, and in 1989 his PhD in International Business from the Stockholm School of Economics.

Roos started his academic career as Research Associate at the Wharton School in 1988. Back in Scandinavia from 1990 to 1994 he was Associate Professor of Strategy at the BI Norwegian Business School. From 1995 to 2000 he was Professor of General Management and Strategy at the International Institute for Management Development (IMD) in Lausanne, Switzerland. In 2000 he founded the Imagination Lab Foundation, which he directed until 2006. In 2007 he returned to Sweden, where he was appointed Professor of Strategy and Dean of the Stockholm School of Economics. After two years as President of Copenhagen Business School from 2009 to 2011, he became Dean & CEO of Jönköping International Business School in 2012.

Selected publications 
 Lorange, Peter, and Johan Roos. Strategic alliances: Formation, implementation, and evolution. (1993).
 Von Krogh, George, and Johan Roos. Organizational Epistemology. New York: St. Martin's Press, 1995.
 Roos, Johan, Leif Edvinsson, and Goran Roos. Intellectual capital: navigating in the new business landscape. New York University Press, 1998.
 Lissack, Michael, and Johan Roos. The next common sense;'Mastering corporate complexity through. (2000).

References

External links 

Living people
1961 births
Hult International Business School administrators
Swedish business theorists
Swedish University of Agricultural Sciences alumni
Stockholm School of Economics alumni
Wharton School of the University of Pennsylvania faculty
Academic staff of BI Norwegian Business School